Timothy Rowe is the founder and CEO of Cambridge Innovation Center (CIC), founder of Venture Café, partner of New Atlantic Ventures, Chair of LabCentral, and Chair of MassRobotics. Previously, Rowe has served as a lecturer at the MIT Sloan School of Management, a manager with the Boston Consulting Group, and an analyst with the Mitsubishi Research Institute. Rowe speaks Spanish and Japanese fluently and holds an MBA from MIT’s Sloan School of Management and a BA from Amherst College.

He was a major supporter of the Kendall Square Association, a nonprofit group with the goal to improve the Kendall Square area through innovation. In 2012, he helped create their "Walk of Fame" to display the contributions of their innovators. The group installed plaques on the sidewalks modeled after the stars along Hollywood Boulevard.

Cambridge Innovation Center 
Rowe contacted MIT for their smallest space to lease, eventually signing a lease for a 3,000-square-foot office. The space was too large for just him and his wife, so they invited friends to stay with them. Rowe, his wife Amy, and his friends began starting companies and using the offices for their new companies. It was during this time that Rowe came up with the idea to create a shared work environment, which became the Cambridge Innovation Center (CIC).

When Joi Ito came to Boston to run the MIT Media Lab, Rowe brought Joi to CIC with Rich Miner. In 2014, he was named Entrepreneur of the Year.

CIC is the "largest space for startups." CIC currently has shared innovation spaces with the Cambridge Space, and spaces in Boston, Massachusetts; St. Louis, Missouri; Providence, Rhode Island; Rotterdam, Netherlands; Philadelphia, Pennsylvania; Tokyo, Japan, and Warsaw, Poland.

See also 
 Cambridge Innovation Center (CIC)
 Venture Cafe

References

External links 
 

Businesspeople from Boston
American real estate businesspeople
Businesspeople in technology
MIT Sloan School of Management alumni
Living people
American chief executives
MIT Sloan School of Management faculty
Technology company founders
American venture capitalists
Businesspeople from Cambridge, Massachusetts
Amherst College alumni
Year of birth missing (living people)